This glossary defines terms related to the sport of table tennis.

 

 

  

 

 

 

 

 

 

 

{{term|term=Playing surface}}

 

 

 

 See also Table tennisInternational Table Tennis FederationUSA Table TennisTable tennis stylesTable tennis racket'''

References

Bibliography 
 
 
 
 
 

Glossaries of sports

Table tennis-related lists
Wikipedia glossaries using description lists